Mohan is a constituency of the Uttar Pradesh Legislative Assembly covering the city of Mohan in the Unnao district of Uttar Pradesh, India.

Mohan (मोहान), sometimes spelt Mohana or erroneously Mahon in some government records and pronounced मोहान (उन्नाव जिला), is one of six assembly constituencies in the Unnao Lok Sabha seat. Since 2008, this assembly constituency is numbered 164 amongst 403 constituencies.

Currently this seat belongs to Bharatiya Janata Party candidate Brijesh Kumar rawat who won in last Assembly election of 2017 Uttar Pradesh Legislative Elections defeating Bahujan Samaj Party candidate Radhe Lal Rawat by a margin of 54,095 votes.

Members of Vidhan Sabha
 1957 : Seat did not exist
 1962 : Sukh Lal (Jana Sangh) 
 1977 : Bhagauti Singh (JNP) 
 1980 : Chandra Shekhar Trivedi (INC-I)
 1985 : Bhagoti Singh (IND)
 1991 : Gomti Prasad (BJP) 
 1993 : Rajendra Prasad (SP)     
 1996 : Gomti Yadav (BJP) 
 2017 : Brijesh Kumar rawat (BJP)

Election Results

1962 Vidhan Sabha Elections
 Sukh Lal (BJS) : 14,738 votes
 Basat Lal (INC) : 13,612

1977 Vidhan Sabha Elections
 Bhagauti Singh (JNP) : 32,824 votes  
 Chandra Shekhar Trivedi (INC) : 21,350

1993 Vidhan Sabha Elections
 Rajendra Prasad (SP) : 66,540 votes
 Rajnath Singh (BJP) : 58,572

1996 Vidhan Sabha Elections
 Gomti Yadav (BJP) : 76,097 votes
 Rajendra Prasad Yadav (SP) : 60,432

See also
 List of constituencies of Uttar Pradesh Legislative Assembly

References

External links
 

Assembly constituencies of Uttar Pradesh
Unnao district